Michael Lerchl (born 9 August 1986 in Windhoek, Namibia) is a German retired footballer who played as a midfielder.

References

External links 
 

1986 births
Living people
Footballers from Windhoek
German footballers
Association football midfielders
2. Bundesliga players
Dynamo Dresden players
FC Energie Cottbus players
FC Energie Cottbus II players
RB Leipzig players
Namibian men's footballers